Events from the year 1854 in France.

Incumbents
 Monarch – Napoleon III

Events
27 March - United Kingdom declares war on Russia and Crimean War begins.
28 March - France declares war on Russia.
16 August - Russian troops in the island of Bomarsund in Åland surrender to French-British troops.
18 August - Siege of Petropavlovsk by Anglo-French naval forces begins.
20 September - Battle of Alma, Anglo-French force defeats the Russians in the first battle of the war.
17 October - Siege of Sevastopol by Anglo-French forces begins.
25 October - Battle of Balaclava, indecisive battle between the allied forces of the United Kingdom, Second French Empire and the Ottoman Empire against Russia.
5 November - Battle of Inkerman, Anglo-French forces defeat the Russians.
27 November - André-Adolphe-Eugène Disdéri patents a method of producing carte de visite photographs.
Luxury goods brand Louis Vuitton is founded in Paris by Louis Vuitton.

Births
29 April - Henri Poincaré, mathematician, theoretical physicist and philosopher of science (died 1912)
2 September - Paul Marie Eugène Vieille, chemist and gunsmith (died 1934)
6 September - Georges Picquart, army officer and Minister of War, exposed the truth in the Dreyfus Affair (died 1914)
20 October - Arthur Rimbaud, poet (died 1891)
5 November - Paul Sabatier, chemist, shared Nobel Prize in Chemistry in 1912 (died 1941)
17 November - Hubert Lyautey, Marshal of France (died 1934)

Deaths
3 January - Adolphe Delattre, ornithologist (born 1805)
28 January - Jérôme-Adolphe Blanqui, economist (born 1798)
14 March - Louis Léon Jacob, admiral (born 1768)
5 July - Émile Souvestre, novelist (born 1806)
2 September - Pierre Alphonse Laurent, mathematician (born 1813)
7 September - Jacques-François Ancelot, dramatist (born 1794)
14 December - Léon Faucher, politician and economist (born 1803)

References

1850s in France